= Church of the True God, Shaoxing =

- 绍兴真神堂
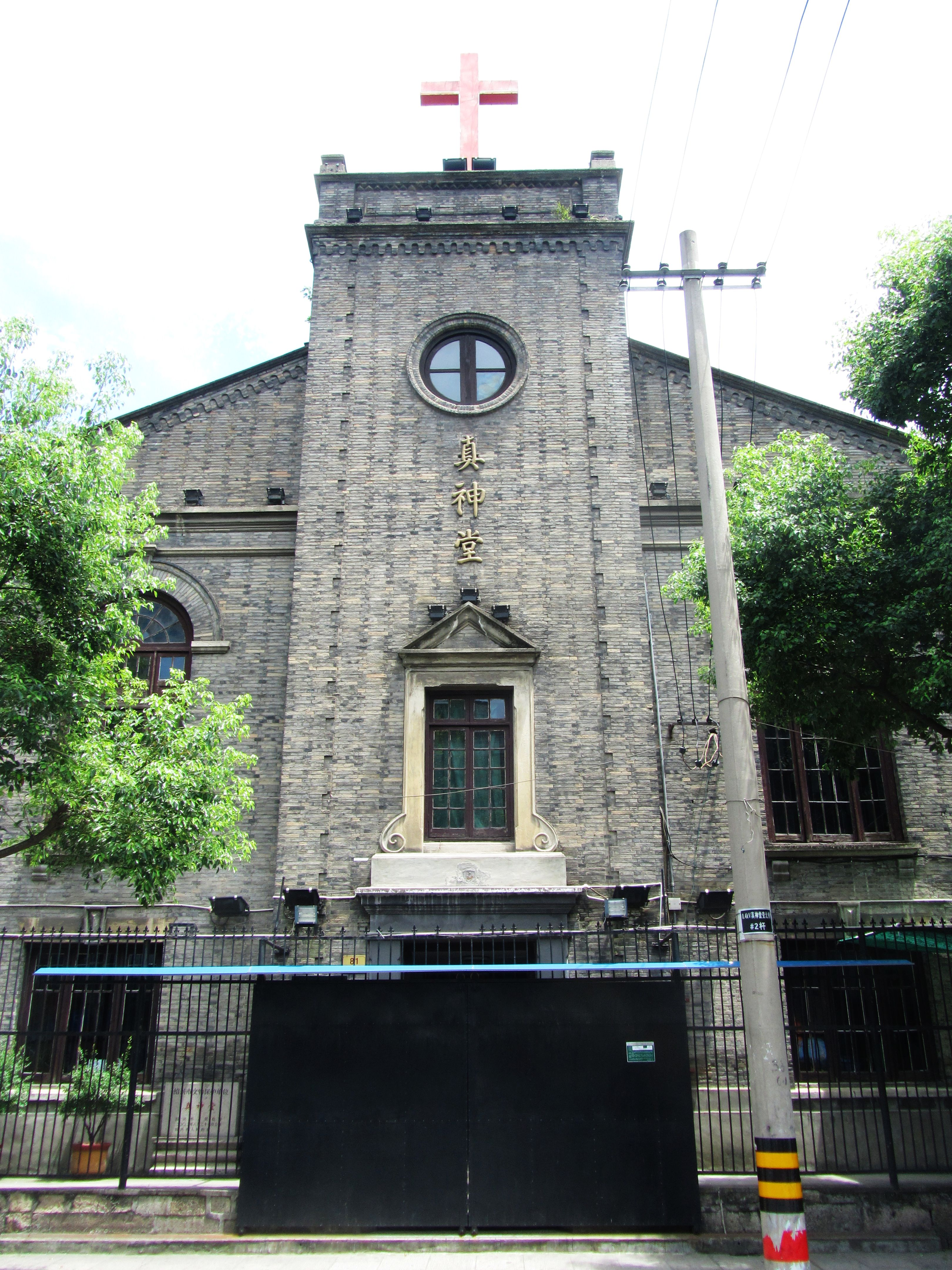
- Church of the True God, Shaoxing in 2012

- Location in Zhejiang
- 29°59′29″N 120°33′04″E
- Location: Shaoxing, Zhejiang, China
- Denomination: Protestantism

History
- Status: Parish church
- Founded: 1871
- Founder: Qin Jing

Architecture
- Functional status: Active
- Architectural type: Church building
- Completed: 1920 (reconstruction)

Specifications
- Materials: Granite, bricks

Chinese name
- Simplified Chinese: 绍兴真神堂
- Traditional Chinese: 紹興真神堂
Transcriptions
Standard Mandarin
- Hanyu Pinyin: Shàoxīng Zhēnshéntáng

Church of the True God, Shaoxing (Chinese: 绍兴真神堂) is a Protestant church located on the East Street, in Shaoxing, Zhejiang, China.

== History ==
The American Baptist Churches USA came to Shaoxing in 1866. The church was first built in 1871 by American minister Qin Jing (秦镜) and was rebuilt in 1920.

The church was closed during the ten-year Cultural Revolution and became a seat of the Red Guards. In 1976, it was used as a theater for the Shaoxing Opera Troupe. The church was officially reopened to the public in 1982 after renovations. In August 2002, it was designated as a municipal cultural relic preservation organ by the Shaoxing government.
